Portugal is a destination and transit country for women, men, and children subjected to trafficking in persons, specifically forced prostitution and forced labor. Trafficking victims in Portugal are from Brazil, Colombia, Dominican Republic, Venezuela, Romania, Bulgaria, Ukraine, Moldova, Poland and some African countries. Children from Eastern Europe, including Romani, are subjected to forced begging, sometimes by their families.

The government prosecuted a landmark trafficking case in 2009 resulting in significant jail time for eight convicted sex traffickers. It stepped up its anti-trafficking training for law enforcement and labor inspectors, improved collection of comprehensive national data on trafficking, and provided shelter and assistance to an increased number of trafficking victims. Despite these notable efforts, the government neither provided complete data on the overall number of trafficking offenders sentenced, nor indicated whether the majority of traffickers received jail time—a long-standing problem in Portugal. Furthermore, it did not systematically employ a victim-centered approach to front-line victim identification, which continued to result in few victims receiving care and assistance in 2009.

U.S. State Department's Office to Monitor and Combat Trafficking in Persons placed the country in "Tier 1"  in 2017.

Prosecution
The Government of Portugal made some important progress towards meeting the minimum standards during the reporting period. In 2009, the government achieved a significant milestone in its anti-trafficking law enforcement efforts by aggressively prosecuting a sex trafficking case resulting in the highest penalties ever handed down for a trafficking crime in Portugal. In this case, the government convicted eight trafficking offenders for forcing 23 Romanian girls into prostitution, resulting in an average sentence of 12 years in prison. Portugal prohibits trafficking in persons for both forced labor and commercial sexual exploitation through Article 160, which prescribes penalties of three to 12 years’ imprisonment – which are sufficiently stringent and commensurate with those for other serious crimes. Although the government prohibits slavery and exploitation of prostitution by means of force, fraud, and coercion under Articles 159 and 169 respectively, it used its broader Article 160 to prosecute traffickers. During 2008 and 2009, police conducted 83 investigations of possible cases of trafficking. During the same time period, the government reported it prosecuted 207 suspected traffickers, convicting 298 under Article 160; the government reported this data was preliminary. This data could also include broader crimes involving sexual exploitation. The government did not provide sentencing information for all convicted traffickers to demonstrate that the majority of those convicted for trafficking received jail time in 2009. In previous years, courts suspended the sentences for the majority of convicted traffickers in Portugal. The government provided specialized anti-trafficking training to judges in December 2009 and trained labor inspectors in January 2010. Law enforcement officials continued to receive periodic specialized anti-trafficking training.

Protection
The Government of Portugal improved its efforts to protect identified trafficking victims. Authorities identified 272 potential victims during 2008 and 2009, confirming 48 as official victims during this two-year period. During the reporting period, the government continued to employ a standardized method for collecting information on trafficking victims and informing those victims about available assistance while temporarily detaining them. The government's shelter took in 12 of these identified victims in 2009. One NGO reported assisting eight trafficking victims with government funding in 2009 and another reported assisting 30 trafficking victims; the government provided a stipend for each victim. The government continued to report very few victims accepted law enforcement's offers for protection and assistance while detained; thus, many confirmed trafficking victims continued to be exploited by their traffickers or potentially deported after showing indicators of trafficking. The government reportedly worked informally with labor inspectors to identify and refer victims of forced labor. According to local experts, victims’ fear of traffickers and the stigma attached to prostitution render potential victims, particularly victims from Brazil and Nigeria, reluctant to disclose elements of their exploitation to law enforcement. To help address this, law enforcement included NGO shelter staff on three “smart” raids during the reporting period to help stabilize victims immediately after the operation.

The government continued to fund an NGO-run specialized trafficking shelter; other NGOs assisting trafficking victims received a fixed subsidy from the government for each victim. One NGO received approximately 80 percent of its budget from the government. However, NGOs report overall funding is inadequate in order to provide critical specialized care required for trafficking victims. The government encouraged victims to participate in investigations and prosecutions of trafficking offenders; six victims assisted in the investigation against their traffickers in 2009. The government reported all identified victims are permitted a 30- to 60-day reflection period during which to decide whether they wished to participate in a criminal investigation. The government provided foreign victims of trafficking with short-term legal alternatives to their removal; victims are given a limited time to legalize their residency status or are repatriated by government shelter staff on an ad hoc basis. The Portuguese chapter of the IOM also reported it can reintegrate and return trafficking victims through its Assisted Voluntary Return program and it is currently working with the government and NGOs to create a reintegration/return program specifically tailored for trafficking victims. The IOM reported it had no cases of return during the reporting period. The government reported it granted six permanent residency permits to victims of trafficking in 2009. The government has a stated policy of not punishing victims for unlawful acts committed as a direct result of their being trafficked. The government reported police made proactive efforts to identify sex trafficking victims within the legal prostitution sectors; unidentified victims are likely deported or continue to be subjected to exploitation. According to local experts, lack of awareness regarding the trafficking of children hindered the government's response and ability to protect these children.

Prevention
The Government of Portugal continued to take steps to prevent trafficking during the reporting period. It took the lead in coordinating and implementing an EU-wide database to develop, consolidate, and share common indicators on trafficking among partner countries. The government continued to fund public service ads warning against trafficking. It also broadcast a daily program on state television to raise awareness among migrants in Portugal on a wide range of issues, including trafficking. Portugal continued to train healthcare professionals on victim identification in 2009. The government set a date to begin developing a campaign to target demand during the reporting period, but did not conduct specific awareness campaigns to educate clients of prostitution about trafficking and forced prostitution in Portugal. The government conducted anti-trafficking awareness training to troops before their deployment on international peacekeeping efforts abroad.

References

Portugal
Portugal
Human rights abuses in Portugal
Crime in Portugal by type